Lamprosema variospilalis is a moth in the family Crambidae that is found in Peru. It was described by Paul Dognin in 1908.

References

Moths described in 1908
Lamprosema
Moths of South America